"Lose Control" is a song performed by British electronic duo Kish Mauve. The song was written and produced by Kish Mauve for their debut album Black Heart (2009). It was released as a single on 22 September 2008 by YNYS Recordings. The song was originally written for Australian singer Kylie Minogue. Minogue recorded the song, but it did not appear on her 2007 album X. On 23 February 2009, NAPT released their remixes of the song as a digital download and 12-inch single.

Formats and track listings
These are the formats and track listings of major single releases of "Lose Control".

Digital download
(Released )
"Lose Control" – 3:45
"Lose Control" (Fred Falke remix) – 8:14
"Lose Control" (Michael Morph remix) – 8:42
"Lose Control" (Chewy Chocolate Cookies remix) – 5:24
"Lose Control" (Neoteric remix) – 7:11
"Lose Control" (Superbass extended remix) – 5:12
"Lose Control" (Superbass radio edit remix) – 4:09
"Lose Control" (Sei A remix) – 7:10
"Lose Control" (Stockholm Syndrome remix) – 7:29
"Lose Control" (Kish Mauve White Noise remix) – 5:57
"Lose Control" (Kish Mauve extended remix) – 4:44
"Lose Control" (Stockholm Syndrome radio edit remix) – 3:30
"Lose Control" (Fred Falke radio edit remix) – 3:39

NAPT vs. Kish Mauve digital download
(Released )
"Lose Control" (12" dub mix) – 7:00
"Lose Control" (Vocal mix) – 6:30

NAPT vs. Kish Mauve 12-inch single
(FTECH #031, Released )
"Lose Control" (12" dub mix) – 7:00
"Lose Control" (Vocal mix) – 6:30

References

External links
Official Myspace

2008 singles
Songs written by Jim Eliot
Songs written by Mima Stilwell
2008 songs
Kish Mauve songs